Elliott Cornelius Jackson Jr. (born November 11, 1972), nicknamed Jack Jackson, is an American former college and professional football player who was a wide receiver for four seasons in the National Football League (NFL) and Arena Football League (AFL).  Jackson played college football for the University of Florida, and earned All-American honors.  Thereafter, he played professionally for the Chicago Bears of the NFL, and also the Orlando Predators, Carolina Cobras and Florida Bobcats of the AFL.

Early years 

Jackson was born in Moss Point, Mississippi.  He attended Moss Point High School, where he played high school football for the Moss Point Tigers.

College career 

Jackson received an athletic scholarship to attend the University of Florida in Gainesville, Florida, where he was a featured wide receiver for coach Steve Spurrier's Florida Gators football team from 1992 to 1994.  Memorably, he had a 100-yard kick-off return for a touchdown against the Mississippi State Bulldogs in 1993, and led the nation with fifteen receiving touchdowns in 1994.  He finished his college career with 143 catches for 2,266 yards (an average of 15.8 yards per reception) and twenty-nine touchdowns.  Jackson was a first-team All-Southeastern Conference (SEC) selection, the SEC Offensive Player of the Year in 1994, and a consensus first-team All-American.

Professional career 

After his junior college season, Jackson decided to forgo his senior season and enter the NFL Draft.  He was chosen by the Chicago Bears in the fourth round (116th pick overall) of the 1995 NFL Draft, and he played for the Bears for two seasons.

In 1999, Jackson played for the Mobile Admirals of the short-lived Regional Football League. He also played two seasons in the Arena Football League, spending time with the Orlando Predators, Carolina Cobras and Florida Bobcats.

See also 

 1994 College Football All-America Team
 Florida Gators football, 1990–99
 List of Chicago Bears players
 List of Florida Gators football All-Americans
 List of Florida Gators in the NFL Draft
 List of NCAA major college football yearly receiving leaders

References

Bibliography 

 Carlson, Norm, University of Florida Football Vault: The History of the Florida Gators, Whitman Publishing, LLC, Atlanta, Georgia (2007).  .
 Golenbock, Peter, Go Gators!  An Oral History of Florida's Pursuit of Gridiron Glory, Legends Publishing, LLC, St. Petersburg, Florida (2002).  .
 Hairston, Jack, Tales from the Gator Swamp: A Collection of the Greatest Gator Stories Ever Told, Sports Publishing, LLC, Champaign, Illinois (2002).  .
 McCarthy, Kevin M.,  Fightin' Gators: A History of University of Florida Football, Arcadia Publishing, Mount Pleasant, South Carolina (2000).  .
 Nash, Noel, ed., The Gainesville Sun Presents The Greatest Moments in Florida Gators Football, Sports Publishing, Inc., Champaign, Illinois (1998).  .

1972 births
Living people
People from Moss Point, Mississippi
Players of American football from Mississippi
American football wide receivers
Florida Gators football players
All-American college football players
Chicago Bears players
Regional Football League players
Orlando Predators players
Carolina Cobras players
Florida Bobcats players